Nélson Barbosa Conceição (born 1 January 1988), simply known as Nelsinho, is a Brazilian professional footballer who plays as a left-back for  club Paris 13 Atletico.

Career 
On 29 May 2014, Nelsinho signed for Arouca in the Primeira Liga for a free transfer.

References

External links

1988 births
Living people
Association football defenders
Brazilian footballers
Brazilian expatriate footballers
Primeira Liga players
Liga Portugal 2 players
Cypriot First Division players
Cypriot Second Division players
Championnat National 2 players
J. Malucelli Futebol players
Portimonense S.C. players
F.C. Arouca players
Doxa Katokopias FC players
P.O. Xylotymbou players
Paris 13 Atletico players
Brazilian expatriate sportspeople in Portugal
Brazilian expatriate sportspeople in Cyprus
Brazilian expatriate sportspeople in France
Expatriate footballers in Portugal
Expatriate footballers in Cyprus
Expatriate footballers in France